InAlienable is a 2007 science fiction film with horror and comic elements, written and executive produced by Walter Koenig, and directed by Robert Dyke. It was the first collaboration of Koenig and Dyke since their 1989 production of Moontrap. Koenig said that "the story really involves that relationship between the human being and the alien. At first, it's assumed that the alien [is] a parasite growing in a host, but because it has some of the human DNA, it's significantly more than that. Even though it comes from another world, it's a part of our world. Really, it's a love story."

Plot
Dr. Eric Norris remains wracked with guilt after a terrible tragedy that cost him his family, and when he learns that an alien parasite is not only growing inside him but shares his DNA, he develops a fiercely paternal bond with the creature. The alien "might regenerate into a surrogate son to replace his own child who was lost years earlier." Koenig plays the antagonist, a scientific research institute administrator who dislikes Norris because he had been mutually in love with Norris's wife, who died; he blames Norris for his own now bleak life and enjoys insulting him. Norris, new love interest Amanda, and attorney Howard Ellis must defend the new child, Benjamin, from being imprisoned by government forces or, worse, destroyed. The courtroom trial covers such issues as habeas corpus and miscegenation.

At first horrified by the growth within him, Eric Norris comes to love the child that he "gives birth to" and names Benjamin. When a court trial begins to take Benjamin away from him, all sorts of arguments are raised about the real meaning of the word "alien." A disturbed man, Emil (Andrew Koenig, Walter Koenig's son), brings a gun into the courtroom and shoots Benjamin, to the loss of all concerned.

Cast 

Walter Koenig  ... 	Dr. Shilling
Alan Ruck	   ... 	Dr. Proway
Bonnie Aarons	   ... 	Blue Skinned Woman
Marina Sirtis	   ... 	Attorney Barry
Erick Avari	   ... 	Howard Ellis
Courtney Peldon	   ... 	Amanda Mayfield
Patricia Tallman ... 	Dr. Klein
Richard Hatch	   ... 	Eric Norris
Andrew Koenig	   ... 	Emil
Gary Graham	   ... 	Andreas Cabrosas
Priscilla Garita	 ... 	Miriam
Jay Acovone	 ... 	Gerhard
Gabriel Pimentel	 ... 	Benjamin (younger)
Lisa LoCicero	 ... 	Dr. Magee
Randy Barnett	 ... 	Richard Herd
Jarrett Grode	 ... 	Medical Employee
Philip Anthony-Rodriguez	 ... 	Braxton
J. G. Hertzler	 ... 	Dr. Lattis
Judy Levitt	 ... 	Judge Deville
Jeff Rector	 ... 	Professor Jeffries
Johnny Drocco	 ... 	Security guard #2
Gelbert Coloma	 ... 	FBI
Robert Olding	 ... 	Medical Assistant #1
Amanda Chism	 ... 	Protestor
Vitaliy Versace	 ... 	Restaurant Patron
Ceilidh Lamont	... 	Lawyer
Anthony Fitzgerald	... 	Zachary - in Court Room
Frances Emma Jenkins	... 	Lab Worker
Kyle Robertson	 ... 	Press Photographer #2
James Runcorn	 ... 	Bailiff
Jennifer Gabbert	 ... 	Hospital Employee #1
Brandon Ford Green	 ... 	Court Clerk
Jett Patrick	 ... 	Adam
Matt Lasky	 ... 	Burly Medical Tech
George Anton	 ... 	Restaurant Patron
Bruce Van Patten	 ... 	Courtroom observer
Shweta Thakur	 ... 	Bar Customer
Jeremy Clark	 ... 	Protester
Bradley Laise	 ... 	Benjamin (older)
Patrick Gough	 ... 	Security #1
Paul Danner	 ... 	Sci-Fi Guard
Peter Renaud	 ... 	Labworker
Jonah Runcorn	 ... 	10 Year Old Boy
Marvin Rouillard	 ... 	Important Man
Jett Patrick Williams	 ... 	Adam
Ashley Walsh	 ... 	Nurse
Oliver Rayon	 ... 	Courtroom Patron
Bob Ross	 ... 	Court Observer
Noe Sanchez	 ... 	Janitor
Zahra Zaveri	 ... 	Bar Customer
Jane O'Gorman	 ... 	Bar Patron
Giovanna Silvestre	 ... 	Laboratory Employee
Tim Russ  ... 	news anchor

Production 
The screenplay was written by Walter Koenig of the original Star Trek series. He told Starburst magazine that he was watching the 2000 World Series with friends, one of whom had appeared in The Blob. "We proceeded to have other conversations along the way about making a film that, at least initially, began the same way as The Blob, with something landing from outer space. And I really took it from there." He told interviewer Chris Wood (who identifies the friend as Anthony Franke), "I wanted to examine the intensity of familial bonding. That was one thing. I also wanted to explore the concept of civil and human rights. But the actual event that sat me down at the computer was when two friends of mine who didn't know each other joined me to watch the New York Yankees play in the World Series back in 2001. My friend Tony Franke had been in the original film of The Blob (1958) and Sky Conway had always been a big fan of the movie. Inspired by Tony's stories, Sky confessed to always wanting to shoot a film about a meteor landing with an alien presence aboard. I holed myself up in my room and took it from there."

It took Koenig a decade to bring the film to fruition. He initially wrote the lead role for himself, but reevaluated his view "that the audience would buy me as a romantic interest", and offered it to Battlestar Galactica's Richard Hatch. He also considered playing attorney Ellis: "In retrospect, I might have had a great deal of fun playing the lawyer — which, I have to admit, Erick Avari so brilliantly played — but I love comedy and I think maybe I could've brought something to it." He chose the role of antagonist Dr. Schilling instead: "I've played heavies before — I had a recurring role on Babylon Five as one — so I'm not unfamiliar with emotional mechanisms and mechanics that go along with it."

Hatch talked about why he accepted the role: "It was very character-driven. It was about
people and relationships. It wasn't [just] about some monster or strange creature; it was
about human beings having to deal with very morally conflicted situations. I wasn't
choosing InAlienable because it was a science-fiction piece, although I love science
fiction. I was choosing it, as I choose any movie that I go watch, because it was about
something meaningful. It was about real people having to struggle with issues that all of
us have to face in our lives."

Marina Sirtis of Star Trek: The Next Generation and other familiar actors from sci-fi franchises were also willing to participate. Koenig's wife, son and daughter had roles on screen.

It was shot on location in Southern California. It is the first feature film made by Renegade Studios, and was released over the internet on a pay-per-view basis.

The film's debut public screening was cut short by Koenig, as the visual quality on the screen at Conglomeration! 2008 was not up to his standards.

Release
This direct-to-DVD film made its debut on the Internet on a pay-per-view basis; it premiered online on December 15, 2008 with a nominal $2.99 fee charged for watching it.

Cultural allusions
 The X-Files - Shilling says, "Norris's friend found a foreign organism attached to a piece of the meteor, and he gave it to him. According to what Norris told him, the thing has gotten inside of him and is growing at an accelerated pace. Norris believes that it is some sort of alien parasite that's determined to free itself and, in the process, kill him."  Gerhard, a government scientist, wonders, "Didn't I see this on X-Files?"
 Attorney Ellis says to Amanda, "I know there're aliens out there. At least, I'm pretty sure there're aliens out there. I mean, how else would you explain Andy Kaufman or Jim Carrey?"
 Newspapers - Ellis, advising a letter-writing campaign to protect Benjamin, urges, "Avoid the tabloids at all costs. Especially The World, The Globe, and that rag, The Star." While Koenig likely was using typical tabloid-type titles, The World might refer to News of the World or World, and The Star likely refers to Rupert Murdoch's The Star. In the same conversation, Ellis refers to The New York Times, Rolling Stone, and The Wall Street Journal. 
 Nazism or Totalitarianism - Ellis asks the judge, "Would anyone dare suggest that the United States government has the right to detain, to conduct experiments on, and deprive a child the love and comfort of a parent just because he's different? What does that sound like to you, your Honor? Do I have to click my boots to make the point?"
 The Elephant Man - Attorney Barry argues in court that "the Elephant Man was a human being... This creature is not a human being, not even remotely."
 Ozymandias - Attorney Barry quotes Percy Bysshe Shelley's poem in court: "Would you want this thing crawling around out there? Would you want this thing marry your families? Look on my work, you mighty, and despair!"

Reception
The film received mixed reviews. 

The website Brutal As Hell wrote that the movie is "a film cheesier than a Kraft dairy farm and far more likable than it has any right to be," while faulting it for being "preachy, corny and overlong, with a shameless heart-string yanking climax." Home Media Magazine wrote, "Like an episode of The Outer Limits, the story veers from expectations, merging traditional sci-fi motifs with the framework of a conventional courtroom drama... It's more thought-provoking than typical 'B'-movie fare, even if the proceedings are a bit hackneyed." Total Sci-Fi Online granted only 1 star out of 10, saying, "At the core of InAlienable is an idea around which a terrific movie could be made, but unfortunately this isn't it." The website DVD Verdict wrote, "A courtroom thriller masquerading as a sci-fi drama, InAlienable is an intriguing effort with higher acting caliber than one might expect... InAlienable is far from groundbreaking cinema, but Koenig plays around with a lot of interesting ideas and themes. Not only does he play the slimy Schilling with tang, he also builds up his story well, keeping us hooked most of the way... What anchors the film is Hatch's powerful performance, but Peldon also makes a strong impression as his partner and lover."

References

External links
InAlienable official website

InAlienable Original Soundtrack by Justin R. Durban

2008 horror films
2008 films
American science fiction horror films
2000s science fiction horror films
2000s English-language films
2000s American films